The following lists events that happened during 1972 in Laos.

Incumbents
Monarch: Savang Vatthana 
Prime Minister: Souvanna Phouma

Events

January
2 January - 1972 Laotian parliamentary election

Deaths
18 October - Vang Sue, Hmong fighter pilot, shot down by anti-aircraft fire (b. 1945)

References

 
1970s in Laos
Years of the 20th century in Laos
Laos
Laos